Ivan Fischenko (born 19 July 1995) is a Russian professional ice hockey player. He is currently an unrestricted free agent who most recently played with Admiral Vladivostok of the Kontinental Hockey League (KHL).

On 28 February 2015, Fischenko made his Kontinental Hockey League debut playing with Avangard Omsk during the 2014–15 KHL season.

References

External links

1995 births
Living people
Admiral Vladivostok players
Avangard Omsk players
Russian ice hockey centres